The 2017 Pine Bowl is a college football bowl game that was played at the Sendai City Athletic Stadium in Sendai, Japan.  The 30th annual Pine Bowl will have Hokkaido University representing the Hokkaido American Football Association playing host to Tohoku University from the Tohoku Collegiate American Football Association.

References

External links

Pine Bowl (game)
2017 in Japanese sport
2017 in American football